is a Japanese voice actor affiliated with Early Wing. Some roles he played include Haruna Wakazato in The Idolmaster SideM, Yamato Nikaidō in Idolish7, and Combat Agent 6 in Combatants Will Be Dispatched!.

Early life 
Yusuke Shirai was born in Saku, Nagano on January 18, 1986. His parents house was an art supply store, and his grandfather was a painter. Shirai's brother, who had been watching anime since he was young, went to Tokyo to enter vocational school to become a voice actor. Due to that, Shirai decided to become a voice actor and entered vocational school himself.

Career 
After graduating from vocational school, he entered a narrator training center, but later left. At one point he wanted to be an actor instead, but later decided he would rather become a voice actor. After that, he entered a training center run by 81 Produce. However, he left the school after one year and entered the Amusement Media Academy. Right before graduation, he was approached by Early Wing to became affiliated with them. He later decided to become affiliated with them. In 2015, he was interviewed in the first issue of Cast Voice, a magazine focusing on male voice actors.

In 2019, Shirai, along with the rest of the cast for Hypnosis Mic: Division Rap Battle, won the singing award at the 13th Seiyu Awards. In March 2020, he started a YouTube channel.

Personal life 
Outside of voice acting, he has been a fan of Liverpool F.C. ever since he watched the 2005 UEFA Champions League Final.

In October 2020, he tested positive for COVID-19, but was asymptomatic.

Filmography

Television animation 
2011

 Future Diary as Student

2012

 La storia della Arcana Famiglia as Renato 

2013

 Karneval as Fake Squirry
 Silver Spoon as Ryo Nishikura 
 il sole penetra le illusioni ~ Day Break Illusion as Shūji Kishida
 From the New World as Kashimura
 Ace of Diamond as Akio
 Magi: The Kingdom of Magic as Townsperson
 Meganebu! as Makoto Senba, Student 
 Little Busters! Refrain as Student B 

2014

 Witch Craft Works as Obama 
 The World is Still Beautiful as Minor Rani Theus 
 Magical Warfare as Schoolboy, Trailer's Magician

2015
Cute High Earth Defense Club Love! as Iō Naruko
Ganbare-bu Next! as Masahiro Yanagida
Diabolik Lovers, More Blood as Lux 
Durarara!!×2 Ten as Heaven Slave

2016
Rainy Cocoa in Hawaii as Shank Osman
Divine Gate as Percival
Rilu Rilu Fairilu: Yousei no Door as Fairilurea
Handa-kun as Kei Hanada
Cute High Earth Defense Club Love! Love! as Iō Naruko 
Nananin no Ayakashi as Shirō

2017
Nana Maru San Batsu as Ryōta Mukai
Hitorijime My Hero as Yusei Yukiya
The Idolmaster SideM as Haruna Wakazato
My Matchmaking Partner is a Student, An Aggressive Troublemaker as Shūji Kuga (TV version)
2018
Idolish7 as Yamato Nikaidō
Dame×Prince Anime Caravan as Mihart
Doreiku The Animation as Takio Minato
Gurazeni as Yukio Ohno
The Thousand Noble Musketeers as Hall
Xuan Yuan Sword Luminary as Meng Ji
Jingai-san no Yome as Tetsukasa Tsuchikiyose
Space Battleship Tiramisu Zwei as Romeo Alpha

2019
Meiji Tokyo Renka as Eiichi Shibusawa
Papa Datte, Shitai as Ryohei Yui
Ao-chan Can't Study! as Masaki Uehara
Stand My Heroes: Piece of Truth as Takaomi Hiyama
Z/X Code Reunion as Nephrite

2020
Uchitama?! Have you seen my Tama? as Tora Kiso
A3! as Masumi Usui
Show By Rock!! Mashumairesh!! as Sojun
Idolish7: Second Beat! as Yamato Nikaidō
The Titan's Bride as Beri Berinal
Hypnosis Mic: Division Rap Battle: Rhyme Anima as Ramuda Amemura

2021
I-Chu as Takamichi Sanzenin
WAVE!! Surfing Yappe!! as Yūta Matsukaze
Combatants Will Be Dispatched! as Combat Agent 6
My Next Life as a Villainess: All Routes Lead to Doom! X as Ian Stuart
Idolish7: Third Beat! as Yamato Nikaidō

2022
Sasaki and Miyano as Shūmei Sasaki
Salaryman's Club as Chiaki Takimoto
Tokyo Mew Mew New as Keiichirō Akasaka
Shine On! Bakumatsu Bad Boys! as Katamori Matsudaira
VazzRock the Animation as Futaba

Anime films 
2023
Sasaki and Miyano: Sotsugyō-hen as Shūmei Sasaki

OVA 
2017

 Cute High Earth Defense Club Love! Love! Love! as Iō Naruko

2022

 Sasaki and Miyano as Shūmei Sasaki

Video games 
2015
I-Chu as Takamichi Sanzenin
Idolish7 as Yamato Nikaido
The Idolmaster SideM as Haruna Wakazato
Quiz RPG: The World of Mystic Wiz as Yukiya Conrad
Moero Crystal as Zenox
Cute High Earth Defense Club LOVE! GAME! as Iō Naruko
100 Sleeping Princes and the Kingdom of Dreams as Dayang

2016
Valkyrie Anatomia: The Origin as Sadamitsu
London Detective Mysteria as William H. Watson
Summon Night 6 as Kiel
Stand My Heroes as Takaomi Hiyama

2017
Akashic Re:cords as Kogoro Akechi
A3! as Masumi Usui
Rage of Bahamut as Apollo
Granblue Fantasy as Mordred

2018
Food Fantasy as  Huangshan Maofeng Tea, Green Curry

2019
Grimms Notes as The Ducklings that are Hard to See

2020
The King of Fighters for Girls as Jhun Hoon
Dragalia Lost as Wise Savior Laufey
Hypnosis Mic: Division Rap Battle as Ramuda Amemura
Bungo and Alchemist as Shimada Seijirou

2021
Arknights as Jaye 
Last Period as Ruse

2022

Nu:Carnival as Garu/Karu

Drama CD 
Re-Kan! as Yamada
Sasaki and Miyano as Shūmei Sasaki
Lovesick Ellie as Aoba
Ore no Buka ga Eroi Mousou wo Yamete Kurenai as Sayama Kaoru

References

External links 
 Official Agency Profile 
 

1986 births
Japanese male video game actors
Japanese male voice actors
Japanese YouTubers
Male voice actors from Nagano Prefecture
Living people
21st-century Japanese male actors